Strain theory can refer to;

In chemistry:
Baeyer strain theory

In social sciences:
Strain theory (sociology), the theory that social structures within society may pressure citizens to commit crime
Value-added theory, the assumption that certain conditions are needed for the development of a social movement

See also
 General strain theory, a theory of criminology developed by Robert Agnew
 Role strain, a concept in role theory in sociology